Callionymus zythros, the Wongat dragonet, is a species of dragonet native to the Pacific waters around Papua New Guinea where it occurs at depths of from .

References 

Z
Fish described in 2000